Tselkovskaya is a rural locality (a village) in Spasskoye Rural Settlement, Tarnogsky District, Vologda Oblast, Russia. The population was 31 as of 2002.

Geography 
Tselkovskaya is located 35 km northwest of Tarnogsky Gorodok (the district's administrative centre) by road. Kharitonovskaya is the nearest rural locality.

References 

Rural localities in Tarnogsky District